Lou Gordon may refer to:
Lou Gordon (aviator) who flew with Amelia Earhart
Lou Gordon (journalist) (1917–1977), American radio and television commentator, and newspaper reporter
Lou Gordon (American football) (1908–1976), American football player

See also
Louis Gordon (born 1965), English musician
Lewis Gordon (disambiguation)